Tamara Martinović (Serbian: Тамара Мартиновић)
(born 1984 in Belgrade, Serbia, Yugoslavia) is a Serbian ballet dancer. She has performed roles in theatrical musicals such as Chicago and Kiss me Kate at the Terazije Theatre in Belgrade (the Serbian equivalent to Broadway).

Career

Martinović is a graduate of the Ballet School "Lujo Davičo" in Belgrade, and is a student of the University of Belgrade Faculty of Philology.

She has danced both in musicals and ballet pieces, including in "Cigani lete u nebo (Gypsies fly in the sky), Poljubi me Kejt
(Kiss me Kate), Chicago, Svetlosti pozornice (Stage Lights), Kabare (Cabaret – Bob Fosse), Nova Dobra stara vremena (New Good Old Times), Neki to vole vruće (Some Like it Hot), Zemlja (Earth - Allegado), La Capinera. All of these are performed at the Pozorište na Terazijama. Tamara is also starring in the Theatre on Terazije production of "Maratonci trče počasni krug", which opened in May 2008.

Media performances
Martinović has performed on television with singer Zdravko Čolić and dancer Aleksa Jelic.

References

Serbian ballerinas
1984 births
Living people